Allan Coventry Munsie (30 September 1906 – c. 1976) was a rugby union player who represented Australia.

Munsie, a flanker, was born in Guyra, New South Wales and claimed 1 international rugby cap for Australia.

References

Australian rugby union players
Australia international rugby union players
1906 births
1970s deaths
Rugby union flankers
Rugby union players from New South Wales